Heniarth Halt railway station is an unstaffed halt on the narrow gauge Welshpool and Llanfair Light Railway serving the hamlet of Heniarth. Alighting passengers are required to step down onto the grass as there is no platform. The railway crosses the River Banwy Bridge 200 yards to the east of the halt.

Opened as Heniarth Gate on 6 April 1903 the station was renamed 'Heniarth' on 1 February 1913.

Originally the halt had a loop which catered for farm and timber traffic. The Great Western Railway withdrew passenger services on 9 February 1931. and the line closed completely on 3 November 1956. By 1963 the line had a passenger service restored by the Welshpool and Llanfair Railway.

Notes

References 
 
 Rushton, Gordon (2015). The Welshpool & Llanfair Railway  Travellers's Guide. Llanfair Caereinion : Welshpool & Llanfair Railway.

External links
 Video footage of Heniarth Halt.
 3 minutes from Welshpool to Llanfair Caereinion

Welshpool and Llanfair Light Railway
Heritage railway stations in Powys
Former Cambrian Railway stations
Railway stations in Great Britain opened in 1903
Railway stations in Great Britain closed in 1931
Railway stations in Great Britain opened in 1963